Eigil Verner Nielsen (born 14 May 1931) is a Danish former football player in the defender position, who played 26 games for the Denmark national football team.

He was born in Nørresundby, and was spotted by Knud Lundberg, coach of Copenhagen club Akademisk Boldklub (AB), during a summer trip to northern Jutland. Nielsen became the first player with no academic background to play for AB, where he gained popularity due to his fighting spirit and technique. He made his debut for the Danish national team in September 1955.

After ending his active career, he ran an auto repair shop, but continued to play football even after he turned 75.

References

1931 births
Living people
Danish men's footballers
Akademisk Boldklub players
Denmark international footballers
People from Nørresundby
Association football defenders
Sportspeople from the North Jutland Region